The 1983 GWA Tennis Classic was a men's tennis tournament played on indoor carpet courts at the Sleeman Centre in Brisbane, Queensland in Australia that was part of the 1983 Volvo Grand Prix. It was the inaugural edition of the tournament and was held from 3 October through 9 October 1983. Eighth-seeded Pat Cash won the singles title.

Finals

Singles
 Pat Cash defeated  Paul McNamee 4–6, 6–4, 6–3
 It was Cash's 1st singles title of the year and the 2nd of his career.

Doubles
 Paul McNamee /  Pat Cash defeated  Mark Edmondson /  Kim Warwick 7–6, 7–6

References

External links
 ITF tournament edition details

GWA Tennis Classic
GWA Tennis Classic, 1983
GWA Tennis Classic
GWA Tennis Classic
Sports competitions in Brisbane
Tennis in Queensland